Bishop Victor R. Fernandes was the Bishop of the Mangalore Diocese from 1931 to 1955.

Notes

External links
Official website of Mangalore Diocese

20th-century Roman Catholic bishops in India
Mangaloreans
Year of birth missing
Year of death missing